Abel Joseph "Jack" Diamond,  (November 8, 1932–October 30, 2022) was a South Africa-born Canadian architect. Diamond arrived in Canada in 1964 for the University of Toronto. In 1974, he established his architectural practice, A.J. Diamond Architects. This practice evolved into Diamond Schmitt Architects.

Personal life and education 
Jack Diamond was born on November 8, 1932, in Piet Retief, South Africa, and he belongs to a Jewish  family. Diamond's great-grandfather was a rabbi in London, England. In 1917, Diamond's grandfather died in a pogrom in Lithuania. Diamond's father, Jacob Diamond, migrated to South Africa before the Second World War.

Diamond's mother had kept a house plan that Diamond drew when he was four. His love of architecture began at a young age. To Diamond, buildings have been a unique way of playing house. Diamond has a passion for various forms of art; painting, sketching, and music.

Diamond has a love of watercolor paintings and sketches. His house is decorated with cities and landscapes paintings from throughout his career. His sketches are published in a book by Douglas & McIntyre, called Sketches: From Here and There. The book consists of many sketches that resemble his very own sketch book.

In 1956, Diamond received a Bachelor of Architecture from University of Cape Town. He subsequently studied Philosophy, Politics and Economics at University College, Oxford, graduating in 1958. Diamond received his Masters of Architecture at University of Pennsylvania  in 1962. It was at Oxford University where Diamond met his wife, Gillian. In Philadelphia, Diamond worked with the reputable architect, Louis Kahn. In 1964, Diamond moved to Canada and became the director of the Architecture Program at University of Toronto.

In 1995, Diamond was made an Officer of the Order of Canada, and he was awarded the Order of Ontario in 1997.

He served as a member of the Ontario Human Rights Commission from 1986 to 1989, as Chairman of the Design Advisory Committee for the National Capital, Ottawa, and as a Commissioner of the Greater Toronto Area Task Force.

Diamond died at his Toronto home on October 30, 2022.

Career and design approach 
Diamond began his career in architecture in 1968, shortly after he joined University of Toronto. He stayed with the University of Toronto until 1970.

In 1970, Diamond persuaded people in Toronto to consider heritage preservation of an old ceramics manufacturing plant. At the time, the idea of preserving an old warehouse was a bizarre concept. Diamond had borrowed money and renovated the building and lived in one of the floors. The project was successful and other individuals showed interest. The old warehouse went under renovation and was later sold to Ed Mirvish. Diamond is a known pioneer in Toronto's heritage restoration.

In 1975, Diamond established his practice A.J. Diamond Architects. In 1978, he formed a partnership with Donald Schmitt and Company and the practice evolved into Diamond and Schmitt Architects employing over 120  staff. Diamond Schmitt Architects have designed academic, cultural, commercial, healthcare, civic and residential buildings.  Their approach to architecture revolves around human activity. They challenge design in hopes of creating spaces that create a better way of living by using creative design strategies.

Notable projects

Four Seasons Centre for the Performing Arts 
The Four Seasons Centre for the Performing Arts opened in 2006. It is home to the Canadian Opera Company and the National Ballet of Canada. The Performing Arts Centre design keeps the city noise of Toronto out.

United Kingdom Holocaust Memorial Competition 
The United Kingdom Holocaust Memorial was an international design competition held in 2017. Diamond Schmitt's entry was among the finalists, although it was ultimately not selected. Located in Victoria Tower Gardens, the entrance of the Memorial is a ramp that circles around the middle. The cast-iron walls are a darker material, a reminder of the events that took place in the Holocaust. The sunken middle opens up to the sky to bring lightness into the memorial and contrast to the darker walls. The middle of the Memorial is the 'Court of Conscience'. The recitation of the names of the victims are the only sounds heard within the quiet memorial.

Mariinsky II 
The Mariinsky II opened in 2013 in St. Petersburg, Russia. This theater was one of the first major Russia opera houses to be constructed in over a century. Acoustic quality and the experience of a performance were two main goals when designing the Mariinsky II. The main auditorium of the theater is clad in Onyx. The warm glow from the Onyx can be seen at street level outside. The warm glow is considered to be the artistic spirit from art institutions in Russia. The backstage is designed to allow for 5 stages to be worked on simultaneously, making it easier for crews working on productions. The theater is a symbolism of the power art has within Russia.

Other projects 
 1978: Citadel Theatre, Edmonton, Alberta, Canada
 1981: Central YMCA Toronto
 1981: Village Terraces, 260 Heath Street West, Toronto
 1986: Newcastle Town Hall
 1988: Jerusalem City Hall, Israel
 1988: York University Student Centre, Toronto, Ontario Canada
 1989: Richmond Hill Library, Richmond Hill, Ontario Canada
 1995: Baycrest Apotex Retirement Centre, Toronto, Ontario, Canada
 2001: Jewish Community Center in Manhattan
 2006: Four Seasons Centre for the Performing Arts, Toronto, Ontario Canada
 2007: Harman Center for the Arts, Washington D.C., USA
 2008: Southbrook Vineyards, Niagara-on-the-Lake, Ontario, Canada
 2009: Women's College Hospital Master Plan, Toronto, Ontario Canada
 2010: Corus Quay Building, Toronto, Ontario Canada
 2011 : Montreal Symphony House, Montreal, Quebec, Canada (with SNC Lavalin and Aedifica, Montreal)
 2011: Li Ka Shing Knowledge Institute, Toronto, Ontario Canada
 2011: Burlington Performing Arts Centre, Burlington, Ontario, Canada
 2012: Osgoode Hall Law School, Toronto, Ontario Canada
2013:  Bridgepoint Health Chronic Long Term Health Care Complex, Toronto, Ontario Canada
2013:  The Mariinsky Theatre (Second Stage) New Opera, St. Petersburg, Russia

Work in progress
Black Sea Residential Resorts, Obzor, Bulgaria (with Urbiarch, Obzor)

Publications

1996:  Works: The Architecture of A. J. Diamond, Donald Schmitt and Company, 1968–1994
2007: "Urban Form, Transportation and Sustainability". Ideas that Matter, July 30
2007: "Sprawl is our 'Inconvenient Truth. The Globe and Mail, May 18
2008: Insight and On Site, The Architecture of Diamond and Schmitt.
2010:  Sketches from Here and There 
2022: Context and Content: Memoirs of a Fortunate Architect

Honors and awards 

 1976: Governor General's Medal in Architecture for the Citadel Theater in Edmonton
 1984: Governor General's Medal in Architecture for the Metropolitan Toronto Central YMCA
 1989: Toronto Arts Award for Architecture and Design
 1990: Governor General's Medal in Architecture for the Earth Sciences Centre at University of Toronto
 1991: Governor General's Medal in Architecture for the York University Student Centre<
 1993: Governor General's Medal in Architecture for the Richmond Hill Central Library
 1995: Doctor of Engineering (Honoris Causa), Dalhousie University
 1995: Officer of the Order of Canada
 1997: Order of Ontario
 2001: Royal Architectural Institute of Canada Gold Medal
 2001: Royal Architectural Institute of Canada Award of Excellence for Innovation in Architecture
 2005: Royal Architectural Institute of Canada Award of Excellence for Innovation in Architecture

References

External links
 Interview with Jack Diamond in Podcast Aesthetic Intent
Abel Joseph Diamond oral history interview held at the University of Toronto Archives and Records Management Services

1932 births
Living people
People from Piet Retief, Mpumalanga
Canadian architects
Canadian Jews
Officers of the Order of Canada
Members of the Order of Ontario
University of Cape Town alumni
Alumni of the University of Oxford
Alumni of University College, Oxford